William R. Hill (May 23, 1936 – June 1, 2020) was an American-born Canadian football player who played for the Edmonton Eskimos and Montreal Alouettes.

References

2020 deaths
1936 births
Edmonton Elks players